P. glabella  may refer to:
 Pellaea glabella, the smooth cliffbrake, a fern species
 Packera glabella, the butterweed, cressleaf groundsel or yellowtop, a plant species native to central and southeastern North America

See also
 Glabella (disambiguation)